

336001–336100 

|-bgcolor=#f2f2f2
| colspan=4 align=center | 
|}

336101–336200 

|-id=108
| 336108 Luberon ||  || Luberon, a region in the middle of Provence in the far south of France. || 
|-id=177
| 336177 Churri ||  || Carmen "Churri" Lacruz (born 1959), sister of Spanish discoverer Juan Lacruz || 
|}

336201–336300 

|-id=203
| 336203 Sandrobuss ||  || Sandro Buss (born 1970) is a physicist from Geneva. During the 2016–2017 school year he trained as a teacher in Bienne to work at high school level. In the course of his training, he met the discoverer at the Lycée cantonal in Porrentruy (Jura). || 
|-id=204
| 336204 Sardinas ||  || Charo, Miguel Angel, Elvira and Irene, "Los Sardina", have supported and encouraged operations at the La Cañada Observatory in Spain || 
|}

336301–336400 

|-id=392
| 336392 Changhua ||  || Changhua County, a county situated in the mid-western part of Taiwan Island. || 
|}

336401–336500 

|-id=465
| 336465 Deluna ||  || Luna Ruiz (born 2000) is the daughter of Spanish astronomer Jose Maria Ruiz, who co-discovered this minor planet || 
|}

336501–336600 

|-bgcolor=#f2f2f2
| colspan=4 align=center | 
|}

336601–336700 

|-id=680
| 336680 Pavolpaulík ||  || Pavol Paulík (1960–2013), a Slovak amateur astronomer and popularizer of astronomy || 
|-id=694
| 336694 Fey ||  || Elizabeth Stamatina (Tina) Fey (born 1970), an American actor, writer, producer, and comedian. || 
|-id=698
| 336698 Melbourne || 2010 CJ || Melbourne,  capital city of the Australian state of Victoria || 
|}

336701–336800 

|-bgcolor=#f2f2f2
| colspan=4 align=center | 
|}

336801–336900 

|-bgcolor=#f2f2f2
| colspan=4 align=center | 
|}

336901–337000 

|-bgcolor=#f2f2f2
| colspan=4 align=center | 
|}

References 

336001-337000